The 1928 Copa Aldao was the final match to decide the winner of the Copa Aldao, the 8th. edition of the international competition organised by the Argentine and Uruguayan Associations together. The final was contested by Uruguayan club Peñarol and Argentine side Huracán.

The match was played at  River Plate Stadium in Buenos Aires, where Peñarol beat Huracán 3–0, winning its first (and only) Copa Aldao trophy in the history of the club.

Qualified teams

Match details

References

1929 in Argentine football
1929 in Uruguayan football
a
a
Football in Buenos Aires